Crawford Township, Arkansas may refer to:

 Crawford Township, Washington County, Arkansas   
 Crawford Township, Yell County, Arkansas

See also 
 List of townships in Arkansas
 Crawford Township (disambiguation)

Arkansas township disambiguation pages